Marcel-Léger Ecological Reserve is an ecological reserve in Trois-Rivières, Quebec, Canada. It was established in 1981.

References

External links
Official website from Government of Québec

Nature reserves in Quebec
Protected areas established in 1981
Trois-Rivières
Protected areas of Mauricie
1981 establishments in Quebec